Fusion (also released as Something Else) is a double LP album by American jazz flautist Jeremy Steig released on the Groove Merchant label which reissues tracks recorded in 1970 and originally issued on Energy along with an additional LP of unreleased tracks from the session.

Reception 

Allmusic's Jason Ankeny said: "Steig creates Technicolor grooves that float like butterflies and sting like bees. His music doesn't so much fuse jazz and rock as it approaches each side from the perspective of the other, exploring their respective concepts and executions to arrive at a sound all its own. If anything, the tonal restrictions of Steig's chosen instrument push him even farther into the unknown, employing a series of acoustic and electronic innovations to expand the flute's possibilities seemingly into the infinite. While some of the unissued content here is no less astounding, as a whole Fusion feels like too much of a good thing; one can't help but miss the focus and shape of Energy in its original incarnation".

Track listing
All compositions by Jan Hammer and Jeremy Steig except where noted
 "Home" − 4:39 Originally released on Energy
 "Cakes" − 4:52 Originally released on Energy
 "Swamp Carol" − 4:11 Originally released on Energy
 "Energy" (Hammer, Steig, Don Alias, Gene Perla) − 4:50 Originally released on Energy
 "Down Stretch" (Hammer) − 4:14 Originally released on Energy
 "Give Me Some" − 6:47 Originally released on Energy
 "Come with Me" − 8:02 Originally released on Energy
 "Dance of the Mind" (Alias, Steig) − 2:22 Originally released on Energy
 "Up Tempo Thing" − 5:23 Previously unreleased
 "Elephant Hump" − 5:54 Previously unreleased
 "Rock #6" (Hammer) − 3:03 Previously unreleased
 "Slow Blues in G" − 6:33 Previously unreleased
 "Rock #9" (Hammer) − 5:50 Previously unreleased
 "Rock #10" (Hammer) − 4:14 Previously unreleased
 "Something Else" − 7:02 Previously unreleased

Personnel
Jeremy Steig – flute, alto flute, bass flute, piccolo
Jan Hammer − electric piano, Chinese gong
Gene Perla − electric bass, electric upright bass
Don Alias – drums, congas, clap drums, percussion
Eddie Gómez − electric upright bass (tracks 5 & 7)

References

Groove Merchant albums
Jeremy Steig albums
1972 albums
Albums produced by Sonny Lester
Albums recorded at Electric Lady Studios